Los Peyotes is a garage rock and surf rock music group from Argentina, signed to Dirty Water Records.
Los Peyotes were formed in 1996 and take their name from the hallucinogen called Lophophora williamsii.
The band's style is based on garage, proto punk and indie rock. They are characterized by making music from the 60s and wearing vintage clothing at their concerts.

The lyrics of their songs are sung in English and Spanish. The band's music has been strongly influenced by artists like: The Seeds, The Sonics, Los Saicos, Los York's, Los Gatos, Los Shakers and Los Iracundos, among others.

From their 2005 debut album, Caveman, the band acquired popularity, not only in Argentina and Peru, but also in other countries. The band has toured internationally and toured in countries such as: Spain, Mexico, Uruguay, Chile, Brazil, etc.

Members
Pablo Bam Bam - Drums and Screams
Zelmar Garín- Lead Fuzz Guitar and Screams
David Peyote - Vocals, Guitar and Maracas
J.R Lemons - Farfisa Organ and Screams
Oscar Hechomierda - Bass and Screams

Discography
Psychotic Reaction (Animal Records, 2002)  
Cavernicola (Rockaway Records, 2005)  
El Humo Te Hace Mal 7  (Dirty Water Records, 2007)  
Introducing Los Peyotes (Dirty Water Records, 2008)  
Bdaaa111 7 (Dirty Water Records, 2008)  
Garage o Muerte (Dirty Water Records, 2010)

Tours 
European Tour 2007
European Tour 2008
European Tour 2009
European Tour 2010
 México, Peru y Chile  Tour 2010
 México, Peru y Chile  Tour 2011
 México, Peru y Chile  Tour 2011
 Mexico, Brasil Tour 2013
 Colombia Tour 2015

References

External links
Los Peyotes MySpace
Dirty Water Records website
Review in Efe Eme spanish magazine by Eduardo Tébar

Argentine rock music groups